Sosthène Weis (29 January 1872 – 28 July 1941) was a prolific Luxembourg artist who painted over 5,000 watercolors, mostly of Luxembourg and its surroundings. He also worked as an architect, designing some of Luxembourg's most imposing buildings.

Early life

Born in Niedermertzig near Ettelbruck on 29 January 1872, he was the son of François Weis, a tanner and sawyer. After completing high school at the Athénée in Luxembourg City where Michel Engels first introduced him to graphic art, Weis studied civil engineering from 1891 at the Polytechnic in Aachen and then at the technical university in Munich.

The architect

After his studies, he first worked for a few years for the renowned Munich architect Hans Grässel. After returning to Luxembourg, in 1902 he married Marie Pütz with whom he had three children. The same year, the government charged him to conduct a study in connection with the Maison de Santé in Ettelbruck. In 1904, he designed the Benedictine Convent in Peppange. In 1905, he succeeded Prosper Biwer as government architect and in 1917, he became chief architect for the ARBED steel company. There, together with René Théry from Brussels, he supervised the construction of the new company headquarters in Luxembourg City as well as housing for the employees and workers. Among his most important works are Luxembourg's post-office building, the Limpertsberg Lycée technique des arts et métiers, extensions to the spa facilities at Mondorf-les-Bains and, of course, the ARBED building.

The painter

While Weis was a successful architect, he is now remembered first and foremost for his paintings. Even as a child, he decorated his letters with floral designs. When he was abroad, he followed art courses and studied watercolour painters, especially William Turner. He became passionately fond of watercolour painting, taking his brush and paints wherever he went. In Luxembourg City, he would often go down to the Pétrusse or the Alzette valleys, or out into the suburbs to find interesting scenes to paint. He often returned to paint the same spot when the light had changed, sometimes years later. His paintings are therefore of considerable documentary value. While most of his pictures are of the City of Luxembourg and its surroundings, he also ventured out across the whole country, painting scenes from the Moselle, the mining towns to the south and the mountains to the north. He also painted scenes in the countries surrounding Luxembourg as well as during his travels to Turkey, Tunisia, Greece and Yugoslavia.

His earlier paintings, up to 1900, show the influence of his architectural interests, as buildings are depicted with accurate but rather boring precision. Thereafter, his own romantic post-impressionist style begins to emerge, especially in his work from 1915 to 1945. His warm colours predominate with an abundance of violets, blues and ochres. Weis mastered the art of capturing the moment, poetically reproducing the misty light of the early morning, the heat of noon or the haze gathering in the valleys at sunset. Little by little reality gave way to less precise, more suggestive images as Weis concentrated on the essentials. He would rapidly fill out the main lines of his scenes, interpreting them more and more freely until finally his pictures revealed a world of pride and prejudice.

External links
Watercolours by Sosthène Weis

References

Luxembourgian painters
1872 births
1941 deaths
Landscape artists
Luxembourgian watercolourists
Post-impressionist painters
Luxembourgian architects
Alumni of the Athénée de Luxembourg
Technical University of Munich alumni